Gerdab (also Romanized as Gerdāb; also known as Ābād) is a village in Golestan Rural District, in the Central District of Sirjan County, Kerman Province, Iran. At the 2006 census, its population was 21, in 8 families.

References 

Populated places in Sirjan County